1949–50 Cairo League, the 28th Cairo League competition, champion was decided by results of Cairo teams in national league with no separate matches for Cairo league competition, Al Ahly won the competition for 16th time.

League table

See also
 1949–50 Egyptian Premier League

References

External links
 http://www.egyptianfootball.net/

1949–50 in Egyptian football
Cairo League
1949–50 in African association football leagues